Panaeolus acuminatus, also known as Panaeolus rickenii, is a species of mushroom in the family Bolbitiaceae.

This species contains small amounts of serotonin, 5-HTP, and tryptophan.

Description 
P. acuminatus is a small brown mushroom that has black spores. It has a cap that is less than 4 cm across, hygrophanous, conic to campanulate to plane, usually with an umbo. The gills are dark purplish black, crowded, with several tiers of intermediate gills. The spores are (11) 13 - 15 (17) x 9 - 11 (12) x (6.5) 7 - 8 (9) micrometers, smooth, black, and shaped like lemons. Cheilocystidia present.

Habitat and distribution 
P. acuminatus grows in grass and dung. It has been found throughout North America and Europe and is very widely distributed.

See also

List of Panaeolus species

References

External links
 Mushroom Observer - Panaeolus acuminatus
 Mushroom Observer - Panaeolus acuminatus

acuminatus
Fungi of Europe
Fungi of North America
Fungi described in 1874